The Nicknaqueet River is a river in the Central Coast region of British Columbia, Canada, flowing north into the head of Rivers Inlet just south of the mouth of the Wannock River.

See also
List of rivers of British Columbia

References

Rivers of the Central Coast of British Columbia
Wuikinuxv